Zuqar Island (Jabal Zuqar) is an island in the Red Sea that belongs to Yemen. It lies between the coasts of mainland Yemen and Eritrea, near the Bab-el-Mandeb straits which connect the Red Sea to the Gulf of Aden.  Despite its proximity to the African continent, Zuqar Island is considered a part of Asia because it sits on the Asian continental shelf. It is appropriately 130 km2.

The island consists of a shield volcano overlain by basaltic pyroclastic cones and spatter cones which produced youthful-looking pahoehoe lava flows. Several small coastal cones and islets surrounding Zuqar Island were formed by phreatic eruptions.

Ownership 

Ownership of Zuqar Island was long disputed between Yemen and Eritrea, along with the Hanish Islands. In 1995 this led to active conflict in the Hanish Islands conflict. The Permanent Court of Arbitration in The Hague settled the dispute in 1996, awarding the larger islands, including Zuqar, to Yemen.

References

Islands of the Red Sea
Islands of Yemen
Territorial disputes of Yemen
Territorial disputes of Eritrea
Disputed islands
Eritrea–Yemen relations
Polygenetic shield volcanoes
Volcanoes of Yemen
Volcanoes of Eritrea